Joseph-Barnabé Saint-Sevin, dit L′Abbé le Fils (1727–1803) was a French composer and violinist. According to Sheila Nelson, "The very important work of L'Abbé le fils...put France in advance of the rest of Europe with regard to violin technique."

He was an important personality in the French school of violin virtuosos in the eighteenth century, a composer and, most memorably, author of a highly influential violin method, "the first substantial French violin method," of that time: Principes du Violon (1761). He studied with Jean-Marie Leclair.

He was the son of the cellist Philippe Saint-Sevin (l′Abbé cadet) and the nephew of Pierre Saint-Sevin (l′Abbé l′ainé).

References

1727 births
1803 deaths
French Baroque composers
French Classical-period composers
18th-century French male classical violinists
French male classical composers
People from Agen
17th-century male musicians